Babak Hatami (born August 15, 1986) is an Iranian footballer who plays as a defender for Shahin Bushehr of the Azadegan League.

Club career
He started his career with Shahrdari Tabiz. In the summer of 2013 he joined Saipa.

Persepolis
He joined Iranian giants, Persepolis late in December 2014 after agreement signing between Persepolis and Saipa with a fee around 2 billion R (about US$70,000). He signed 18-month contract with The Reds which kept him until end of 2015–16 season with Tehrani side.

Club career statistics

 Assist Goals

References

External links
 Babak Hatami at PersianLeague.com

1986 births
Living people
People from Tabriz
Iranian footballers
Shahrdari Tabriz players
Aluminium Hormozgan F.C. players
Saipa F.C. players
Sportspeople from Tabriz
Persepolis F.C. players
Gostaresh Foulad F.C. players
Azadegan League players
Association football fullbacks
Sepidrood Rasht players
Pars Jonoubi Jam players